Violent is the Word for Curly is a 1938 short subject directed by Charley Chase starring American slapstick comedy team The Three Stooges (Moe Howard, Larry Fine and Curly Howard). It is the 32nd entry in the series released by Columbia Pictures starring the comedians, who released 190 shorts for the studio between 1934 and 1959.

Plot
Administrators at Mildew College, an all-girl school, are begging the school's largest benefactor, Mrs. Catsby (Gladys Gale), to provide an athletic fund for the school. She does not approve of girls playing sports, and informs the administrators that the money will be used for the salaries of the three new Teutonic professors that are arriving that day. Meanwhile, the Stooges have just started a new job as uniformed servicemen at an Acme Service Station, with a strong held belief of "super soyvice!" When they get a customer (three older German men in a chauffeur-driven Packard), they proceed to provide their own inept brand of service, angering the men. The mayhem ends when Curly accidentally puts gasoline in the radiator and Moe checks it with a match. The resulting explosion wrecks the car and prompts the Stooges to flee in a nearby ice cream truck that they had coincidentally thrown the German men's suitcases into.

Three hours later, the Stooges finally stop when they run out of gas. Moe and Larry realize that Curly is still in the back of the truck and is now frozen solid. They thaw him out by tying him to a tree branch over an open fire. This works fine until Curly wakes up on fire and jumps into a nearby lake. When Moe and Larry try to help him out, he pulls them in with him. Now soaked, the boys decide to see if there are any dry clothes in the suitcases they had thrown into the truck.

The suitcases, it turns out, belong to the three new professors for Mildew College, and as the boys, now decked in their gowns and mortarboards, try to hitch a ride, Mrs. Catsby spots them and picks them up, bringing them to the school. During the introductions of the "new professors," a student gets wise with a nonplussed Larry, and in order to test their "mental coordination", Moe begins a rendition of "Swingin' the Alphabet", which starts off fine and eventually transcends into a jazzy, off-time performance.

Later, during the buffet lunch, the three professors show up, blowing the Stooges' cover and vowing to return to "Hamburg on the Clipper!" When Mrs. Catsby angrily confronts the Stooges, they tell her that the college needs athletics, not the foreign professors. They offer to demonstrate and the class follows. Meanwhile, the professors mix an explosive into a basketball. The boys demonstrate football plays using the basketball, and force Mrs. Catsby to join in. After being tackled "on her own five yard line," she agrees to provide an athletic fund if the boys would get the professors back. As the boys are about to agree, Curly throws an errant basket, going over the fence and exploding in front of the professors, who are blown back into the Stooges clutches. The boys vow to clean them up.

Production notes
Violent is the Word for Curly was filmed March 14–17, 1938. The film's title is a parody of the 1936 RKO film Valiant Is the Word for Carrie; the title is notable for being the first that has little bearing on the film's plot.

Footage was reused in the 1960 compilation feature film Stop! Look! and Laugh! A colorized version was released in 2004 as part of the DVD collection "Stooged & Confoosed."

Vesey O'Davoren appeared as Professor Hicks.

Curly's injury
During one scene, Curly is tied to a revolving spit that is placed over an open fire. He is then "roasted" in order to thaw him out after having slept in an ice cream truck. Future Stooge director Edward Bernds was present during the filming and noticed that Curly's weight was causing a problem. "Curly was so heavy Moe and Larry couldn't turn the crank," Bernds said. "The straps holding him slipped and he was hanging directly over the fire. Before they could get him off, he was pretty well seared. Curly was hollering his head off, and I don't blame him. Being roasted alive belongs to the Inquisition, not making two-reel comedies."

References

External links
 

1938 films
The Three Stooges films
American black-and-white films
1938 comedy films
Films directed by Charley Chase
Columbia Pictures short films
American slapstick comedy films
1930s English-language films
1930s American films